= Piolim (footballer, born 1925) =

Brazilian footballer

Turcão
Personal information
- Full name: José Lourenço Pizzini
- Date of birth: March 1, 1925
- Place of birth: Campinas, Brazil
- Date of death: 9 March 2004 (aged 79)
- Place of death: Campinas, Brazil
- Position: Forward

Youth career
- 1936–1940: Rio Branco

Senior career*
| Years | Team | Apps | (Gls) |
| 1940–1942 | Rio Branco | | |
| 1943–1953 | Guarani | | |
- * Club domestic league appearances and goals as of 21 September 2023

José Lourenço Pizzini (1 March 1925 – 9 March 2004), otherwise known as Piolim, was a Brazilian professional footballer who played as a forward.

== Career ==
Piolim started with the youth of Rio Branco EC, before coming to Guarani FC in 1943. There, he was state amateur champion in 1944 and champion of the second professional division in 1949.

== Honours ==
Guarani

- Campeonato Paulista Série A2: 1944 (FPFA), 1949

== Death ==
Piolim died in 2004 in the city of Campinas.
